In statistics, kernel Fisher discriminant analysis (KFD), also known as generalized discriminant analysis and kernel discriminant analysis, is a kernelized version of linear discriminant analysis (LDA).  It is named after Ronald Fisher.

Linear discriminant analysis
Intuitively, the idea of LDA is to find a projection where class separation is maximized.

 

where  is the number of examples of class . The goal of linear discriminant analysis is to give a large separation of the class means while also keeping the in-class variance small.

 

 

The maximum of the above ratio is attained at

 

as can be shown by the Lagrange multiplier method (sketch of proof):
  
Maximizing  is equivalent to maximizing

  

subject to 

  

This, in turn, is equivalent to maximizing , where  is the Lagrange multiplier.  

Taking  yields 

  

Extending LDA
To extend LDA to non-linear mappings, the data, given as the  points  can be mapped to a new feature space,  via some function  In this new feature space, the function that needs to be maximized is 

 

where

 

and

 

Further, note that . Explicitly computing the mappings  and then performing LDA can be computationally expensive, and in many cases intractable. For example,  may be infinitely dimensional.

LDA can be reformulated in terms of dot products by first noting that  will have an expansion of
the form 

 

Then note that

 

where

 

The numerator of  can then be written as:

 

Similarly, the denominator can be written as

 

 

 

Then, differentiating and setting equal to zero gives

 

 

Note that in practice,  is usually singular and so a multiple of the identity is added to it 

 

Multi-class KFD

The extension to cases where there are more than two classes is relatively straightforward.   Let  be the number of classes.  Then multi-class KFD involves projecting the data into a -dimensional space using  discriminant functions

 

This can be written in matrix notation

 

Further, the between-class covariance matrix is now

 

where  is the mean of all the data in the new feature space.  The within-class covariance matrix is

 

The solution is now obtained by maximizing

 

The kernel trick can again be used and the goal of multi-class KFD becomes 

 
 
where  and

 

 

Furthermore, the projection of a new input, is given by 

 

Classification using KFD
In both two-class and multi-class KFD, the class label of a new input can be assigned as 

 

Applications

Kernel discriminant analysis has been used in a variety of applications.  These include:
Face recognition and detection
Hand-written digit recognition
Palmprint recognition
Classification of malignant and benign cluster microcalcifications
Seed classification
Search for the Higgs Boson at CERN

See also
 Factor analysis
 Kernel principal component analysis
 Kernel trick
 Linear discriminant analysis

References

External links
 Kernel Discriminant Analysis in C# - C# code to perform KFD.
 Matlab Toolbox for Dimensionality Reduction - Includes a method for performing KFD.
 Handwriting Recognition using Kernel Discriminant Analysis - C# code that demonstrates handwritten digit recognition using KFD.

Statistical classification